Ayqer Chaman-e Olya (also Romanized as Āyqer Chaman-e ‘Olyā; also known as Āyqer Chaman-e Yek) is a village in Mehranrud-e Jonubi Rural District, in the Central District of Bostanabad County, East Azerbaijan Province, Iran. At the 2006 census, its population was 88, in 18 families.

References 

Populated places in Bostanabad County